Cumbres de Enmedio is a town and municipality located in the province of Huelva, Spain. According to the 2005 census, it has a population of 47 inhabitants and covers a  area (3.4 people/km2).

References

External links
Cumbres de Enmedio - Sistema de Información Multiterritorial de Andalucía

Municipalities in the Province of Huelva